St Peters Rugby Football Club is a rugby union team from the district of Roath, in Cardiff, South Wales. The club plays their home games at the Harlequins Playing Field, located off Newport Road.  It is a member of the Welsh Rugby Union, and is a feeder club for the Cardiff Blues.

The club regards its foundation year as 1886, although it is not until 1888 that the first recorded reference to the club can be found; this was in the regional newspaper, the Western Mail, and was against St. Margarets, also of Roath.

One of the biggest results recorded by the club was beating Cardiff RFC 14-16 in the SWALEC Cup on 23 January 1993.

St Peters have a friendly rivalry with St. Joseph's RFC, another Cardiff team with a strong Catholic heritage. Matches between the two have been described as playing for "The Vatican bragging rights" by BBC sports commentators.

Club honours
Glamorgan County Silver Ball Trophy 1985-86 - Winners
 2013-14 - Youth: Triple Winners of Blues A League, Cardiff & District Cup, East District Cup

Notable former players 
 Billy Neill (the club's first Welsh international)
 Jack Brown (Welsh international)

References 

Welsh rugby union teams
Rugby clubs established in 1886
1886 establishments in Wales
Sport in Cardiff
Roath